Broadacres may refer to:

 Broadacres, Gauteng, a suburb of Johannesburg, South Africa
 Broadacres, Saskatchewan, a hamlet in Saskatchewan, Canada
 Broadacres, Houston, a neighborhood in Houston, United States

See also
 Broadacre, a designation of land in Australia
 Broad Acres, Michigan, an unincorporated community in Michigan